Bismoi is an entertainment Assamese monthly magazine published in Guwahati, Assam since 1968. The magazine is published by Bismoi Prakash and the editor is Shashi Phukan. Renowned assamese writers like Baidurjya Baruah and Ranju Hazarika started publishing their novels and stories here.

See also
List of Assamese periodicals

References

1968 establishments in Assam
Assamese-language mass media
Entertainment magazines
Monthly magazines published in India
Magazines established in 1968